Ulaghchi (Ulaqchi or Ulavchii) Khan (died 1257) was the third khan of the Blue Horde and Golden Horde, ruling for less than a year in 1257.

Life 
It is not clear whether Ulaghchi was the son or the younger brother of Sartaq Khan. Möngke Khan granted him the title of Khan of the Jochid Ulus (Golden Horde) as soon as Sartaq died. Ulaghchi came to power at the age of 10 under the regency of Boraqchin, the khatun of Batu Khan, and Sartaq's uncle, Berke. However, he died in office. H. H. Howorth claimed that he abdicated in favor of his uncle Berke, because the young man sent a person named Ulaghchi to Russia as his lieutenant after he was enthroned.

Genealogy
Genghis Khan
Jochi
Batu Khan
Ulaghchi

See also
List of Khans of the Golden Horde

External links 
 The Mongol Khâns

References

1257 deaths
Khans of the Golden Horde
13th-century monarchs in Asia
Year of birth unknown